Ghana Union of Traders Association (GUTA) is the umbrella body that regulates the activities of trades in Ghana. The body also lobbies the Government of Ghana on issues that affect traders in the country.

References

Business organisations based in Ghana